Jon Devin McGlamery (born June 9, 1982) is an American Christian musician and a GMA Dove Award-winning artist. He is a former tenor member of Karen Peck and New River and former lead vocalist for the Dixie Melody Boys and Ernie Haase and Signature Sound. He released Love is a Verb, a studio album, in 2013 with Stow Town Records.

McGlamery was born Jon Devin McGlamery, on June 9, 1982, in Valdosta, Georgia, the son of Donald and Sandra McGlamery, where he grew up and was raised before starting his professional music career. He now resides in the Nashville, Tennessee area, with his wife, Karen, and two children.

Music career
McGlamery was first a member of the Dixie Melody Boys, from 2000 until 2004, when he left to join Karen Peck and New River during a stint from 2004 until 2009. He became a member of Ernie Haase & Signature Sound in 2010 and remain until the end of October 2021.

He won a GMA Dove Award, for the song, "From My Rags to His Riches", in the category of Country Recorded Song of the Year, with the Ernie Haase & Signature Sound band.

His solo music recording career started in 2013, with the studio album, Love is a Verb, that was released on May 20, 2013, by Stow Town Records. He was nominated for two GMA Dove Awards, for his solo work, in 2014.

Discography
 Love is a Verb (May 20, 2013)

References

External links
 Official website

1983 births
Living people
American performers of Christian music
Musicians from Georgia (U.S. state)
People from Valdosta, Georgia
Musicians from Nashville, Tennessee
Singer-songwriters from Tennessee
21st-century American singers
Singer-songwriters from Georgia (U.S. state)